The Miss Idaho Teen USA competition is the pageant that selects the representative for the state of Idaho in the Miss Teen USA pageant.

Idaho has only placed three times and as such is one of the least successful states at Miss Teen USA.  Their first placement, and the state's only placement for the first twenty-five years of the competition, was in 1989 when Brandi Sherwood won the Miss Teen USA title becoming the 7th state that won the title for the first time. Sherwood went on to make history as the first Miss Teen USA to be crowned Miss USA.

Nine other Idaho teens went on to win the Miss Idaho USA crown, including Sherwood and Elizabeth Barchas, one of only seven women to compete in Miss Teen USA, Miss USA and Miss America.

Angelina Ryan of Boise was crowned Miss Idaho Teen USA 2023 on September 11, 2022 at Red Lion Hotel Templin's on the River in Post Falls. Ryan will represent Idaho for the title of Miss Teen USA 2023.

Results summary

Placements
Miss Teen USA: Brandi Sherwood (1989)
1st runner-up: Jenna Beckstrom (2022)
4th runner-up: Shareece Pfeiffer (2008)
Idaho holds a record of 3 placements at Miss Teen USA.

Awards
Miss Congeniality: Shari Lynn Short (2000), Hosanna Kabakoro (2010)

Winners 

1 Age at the time of the Miss Teen USA pageant

References

External links
Official website

Idaho
Women in Idaho